El Rincón Light is an active lighthouse in the Buenos Aires Province, Argentina. At a height of  it is the nineteenth tallest "traditional lighthouse" in the world, and one of the tallest concrete lighthouses in the world. Two stamps featuring the lighthouse were created, one in 2006 and the other one in 2010.

See also
 List of tallest lighthouses in the world
 List of lighthouses in Argentina

References

External links

List of Lighthouses in Argentina Servicio de Hidrografía Naval

Lighthouses completed in 1925
Lighthouses in Argentina
Buildings and structures in Buenos Aires Province